Melwood Apartments is a historic apartment building at the northeast corner of Michigan Avenue and Hamilton Street in Evanston, Illinois. Built in 1901, the three-story building was one of the first apartment buildings in Evanston. Its construction sparked an outcry in the surrounding neighborhood, which had consisted entirely of single-family houses; the controversy was a precursor to further fights over zoning in Evanston, which ultimately led to the city passing the state's first zoning law in 1921. Architect Wilmore Alloway designed the building with elements of various popular architectural styles of the period. The building features Colonial Revival entrances, Richardsonian Romanesque columns, and Neoclassical ornamentation.

The building was added to the National Register of Historic Places on March 15, 1984.

References

Buildings and structures on the National Register of Historic Places in Cook County, Illinois
Residential buildings on the National Register of Historic Places in Illinois
Buildings and structures in Evanston, Illinois
Apartment buildings in Illinois
Residential buildings completed in 1901